Ödön Pártos [alternate transcription in English: Oedoen Partos,  (Eden Partosh)] (October 1, 1907 in Budapest – July 6, 1977 in Tel Aviv) was a Hungarian-Israeli violist and composer. A recipient of the Israel Prize, he taught and served as director of the Rubin Academy of Music, now known as the Buchmann-Mehta School of Music in Tel Aviv.

Biography 
Partos was born in Budapest (at that time, part of the Austro-Hungarian Empire) and studied at the Franz Liszt Academy of Music, together with Antal Doráti and Mátyás Seiber, studied the violin with Jenő Hubay and composition with Zoltán Kodály. Upon completing his studies, he was accepted to the position of Principal Violinist in an orchestra in Lucerne, after which he played in other European orchestras, among them, in Berlin. In 1934, following Hitler’s ascendance to power, Partos returned to his birthplace, Budapest, where he was Principal Violinist in the city's symphony orchestra.

In 1936, Bronisław Huberman founded the Palestine Orchestra (now: Israel Philharmonic Orchestra), for which he recruited Jewish musicians cast out of Europe's orchestras. Huberman sought to include Partos, though the latter's take-up of the post was delayed due to a prior commitment – a contract with the government of the USSR through which Partos taught violin and composition in the Conservatory of Baku, Azerbaijan. In 1937, Partos left the USSR, after having refused to join the Communist Party during the period of the Moscow Trials. He returned to Budapest, where he served as the orchestra's Principal Violinist along with making concert tours of European countries.
At that time, Bronisław Huberman invited Partos to a meeting in Florence, where he offered him the position of Principal Violist in the Palestine Orchestra. Declining attractive offers from South America (notably, Peru), Partos immigrated to British Mandatory Palestine in 1938.

Between the years 1938–1956, Partos was the principal of the Israel Philharmonic Orchestra's viola section, as well as playing numerous solo performances in Israel and abroad. In 1946, together with cellist László Vincze, he founded the Samuel Rubin Israel Academy of Music (now: Buchmann-Mehta School of Music) in Tel Aviv, and in 1959 was instrumental in founding the Thelma Yellin High School  of Art in Tel Aviv. In 1951, Partos was appointed director of the Rubin Academy, a position he was to hold until his death (although the state of his health during his last five years of life prevented him from taking an active part in the academy's administration, a position filled by Prof. Arie Vardi who succeeded him as director there).

Ödön Partos is regarded as among the most important Israeli composers. He was awarded the Israel Prize in 1954, the first honoree in the field of music.

Among the notable students of Partos: Cecylia Arzewski, Dvora Bartonov, Menahem Breuer, Ilan Gronich, Rami Solomonow, Rivka Golani, Uri Mayer, Rami Bar-Niv, Yehoshua Lakner , Avraham Sternklar, Shelemyahu Zacks, and Noa Blass .

Awards 
 In 1954, Partos was awarded the Israel Prize, for Music.

Further reading 
Avner Bahat, Eden Partosh: Chayav ve-yetsirato. Tel Aviv: Am Oved, 1984 (in Hebrew)

 General references 
 Lyman, Darryl. Great Jews in Music, J. D. Publishers, 1986.
 Tischler, Alice. A descriptive bibliography of art music by Israeli composers, Harmonie Park Press, 1988.
 Weingarten, Elmar; Traber, Habakuk. Verdrängte Musik. Berliner Komponisten im Exil'', Argon Verlag, 1987.

See also 
List of Israel Prize recipients
List of Hungarian Jews
Pártos

References

External links

Biography, Israel Music Institute
Jewish Music Festival at the Hungarian Cultural Centre, London 
The American Symphony Orchestra will perform the US Premiere of Ein gev, Symphonic Fantasy (1952) in 2009 

1907 births
1977 deaths
20th-century classical composers
20th-century classical musicians
20th-century Hungarian people
Israeli classical musicians
Israeli classical violists
Hungarian classical violists
Viola pedagogues
Israeli composers
Hungarian classical composers
Hungarian male classical composers
Israel Prize in music recipients
Jews in Mandatory Palestine
20th-century Israeli Jews
Hungarian Jews
Hungarian emigrants to Mandatory Palestine
Musicians from Budapest
Pupils of Zoltán Kodály
Israeli people of Hungarian-Jewish descent
20th-century Hungarian male musicians
20th-century violists